The 1926 Chelmsford by-election was held on 30 November 1926.  The by-election was held due to the resignation of the incumbent Conservative MP, Henry Curtis-Bennett.  It was won by the Conservative candidate Charles Howard-Bury.

References

1926 in England
Politics of the City of Chelmsford
1926 elections in the United Kingdom
By-elections to the Parliament of the United Kingdom in Essex constituencies
1920s in Essex